Dandoqa is a village in Swabi District of Khyber-Pakhtunkhwa. It is located at 34°10'50N 72°18'56E with an altitude of 319 metres (1049 feet).
It is surrounded by the villages of Tarakai, Yarhussain, Dagi and Sikandari on its north, west, east south respectively. Its population is 4000 to 7000 (2007). The entire village mostly has an arid climate with minimum rainfall. The land is mostly of agricultural use and the population is multi-racial.

History
Dandoka village: "The Broken Sword: sharp & lethal", The Land of Warroirs/Kings/Martyrs in Khyber PakhtoonKhwa, Pakistan. Founded by The Grand Elders of Jaokhel tribes (The Warriors, The Kings). In the past the land of dandoka village was the large fraction of the village Dagi. The land of dandoka was once a battle field in the old times between the tribes of Dagi and Turlandi, has emerged quickly as a portion of populated territory between Dagi and Tarakai. Its population is about 7000 (in 2007) and is one of the smallest villages in District Swabi. Basic tribes of this village includes the Jaokhel, Qurashi, Kaka Khels and others. The issue, that how this area was named Dandoka, has been controversial both for historians and archeologists. According to Archeologist the area got its name Dandoka due to its geographic location between to ancient streams. Any natural stream is called dund in Pushto language. As the area is between two natural dund (Streams) so peoples of the time called it Dandoka, This is the view of Archeologist, which is acceptable according to his geographics principles but its a gossip only and wrong information about the history of this village. Actually the history of Dandoka is correctly explain by Roshan Khan. According to Mr. Roshan Khan in his famous book, "History of Swabian Pathans" the term Dandoka means "Broken Sword". He further mentions that the famous Muslim warrior, Mehmood Ghaznavi met the Indians in a war at this spot. During the battle, the sword of one of his soldiers broke into two pieces. Upon breaking of his sword, he said, "Ah! Dan doka" (Oh! My sword has broken). These words of Ayaz were later on used as a name for this area. However, the local uneducated people accept the views of Archeologist. But the strong family background history individuals and educated class of this village has rejected the idea of Archeologist and they consider the views of Mr. Roshan Khan to be correct. The exact meaning of Arabic word dandoka is Broken/Cut sharp & lethal sword. It is concluded that the views of Mr.Roshan Khan is correct according to Historians and the elders of this area. so the Dandoka means "Broken Sword" and the Broken Sword is more sharp & lethal than the normal one.

Etymology 
The issue, that how this area was named Dandoka, has been controversial both for historians and archeologists. there are two theories about it. According to an Archeologist, the area got its name Dandoka due to its geographic location between to ancient streams. Any natural stream is called "Dund" in Pushto language. As the area is between two natural "Dunds" (Streams) therefore peoples of the time called it Dandoka. On the other hand, according to Mr. Roshan Khan in his famous book, "History of Swabian Pathans" the term Dandoka means "Broken Sword". He further mentions that the famous Muslim warrior, Mehmood Ghaznavi met the Indians in a war at this spot. During the battle, the sword of one of his soldiers broke into two pieces. Upon breaking of his sword, he said, "Ah! Dan doka" (Oh! My sword has broken). These words of Ayaz were later on used as a name for this area. However the ideas of Mr. Roshan Khan are accepted on a large scale by the peoples. The term Dandoqa, is derived from the Tartaric Language, which means "My Broken Sword" which justifies the view of Mr. Roshan Khan.

Today

Today Dandoka, due to its unique geographic location is considered as a separate village from both Dagi and Tarakay. The Grand Elders of Jaokhels sub cast of Yousafzai Malaks Hashimzai tribes put the foundation of this village after conquering and then buying the lands from the peoples of Dagai by legal payments to them. Muqarrab Khan who has a prominent personality also do settled down the long lasting wars & battles between the tribes of Dagi and Turlandi. Therefore, Jaokhel tribes first conquered and then buy this land by putting a barrier between the two villages and to settle down the war and rage between the tribes of Dagi & Turlandi. As the meaning of the name shows "Broken sword". This land Dandoka have been capture back after long lasting wars and battles. And the elders of Jaokhel tribes do shed their blood to conquered this land. Jaokhel tribes were called warriors at that times as they conquered this area, by pushing back the stronger warriors of Turlandi tribes from occupied lands of Dagi tribes. So first to settle in this area were the Jaokhel of Yousafzai Malaks Hashimzai tribes. The Kaka khels, Qurashi and other different small tribes relocate, migrate to dandoka in search of bread and butter. Jaokhel Malaks yousafzai hashimzai tribes high-profile elders did like to gift lands to their new relocating/migrating tribes. Whenever a child born in dandoka particularly in migrated families., the father of child always get a piece of land as a token of gift from the Elders of Jaokhels Malaks of Yousafzai, Hashimzai, Malaks tribes. Nowadays Dandoka is a separate Village. Jaokhels of Yousafzai Malaks Hashimzai tribes actively participated in the Pakistan Movement in British India. The village lies between the ancient two streams,

Developmental status
Developmental works are however negligible in the village as Jaokhel sub cast of Yousafzai, Malaks, Hashimzai tribes affiliated with Pakistan Muslim League during the time of Independence Movement of Pakistan. and Then later joint the Nationalist party of ANP. Due to the affiliation with Nationalist Party ANP most of the local government officials of the region always ignore Dandoka in the development to change the political views and vision of Jaokhel Yousafzai, Malaks, Hashimzai tribes but the said tribes never ever did changes their strong and firm nationalist beliefs, views and vision. 
Dandoka village have only been Middle schools for both boys and girls constructed while No high schools. Similarly no steps have been taken by the government officials to provide services of Post office, health, irrigation and drainage etc. In the present times the leading head Elder of the Village Haji Mohammad Khurshid Khan (the grandson of Hashim Khan) due to his non-violence, educated and humanitarian (Khudai Khidmatgar) life style" is trying his best to do development work in all sectors. The self-esteem frame of mind individuals belonging to different tribes either Jaokhel Yousafzai Malaks Hashimzai or kaka khel or qurashi do work in their field of expertise to serve and upgrade the life standards of the peoples of this village. It is hopeful, that a number of developmental works should be launched in the current government so as to improve the life standards of the peoples here.

Major tribes
The major tribes of (Dandoka) Dandoqa are  "Jaokhels of Yousafzai, Malaks, Hashimzai", "Qureshi" and the "Kakakhels" and others..

Jaokhels of Yousafzai Malaks Hashimzai 
The first Tribe to settle in this area were the Jaokhel tribe is the sub-cast of Yousafzai, Malaks, Hashimzai tribes. From the day of his foundation the Jaokhel Malaks tribes Elder was leading head Elder of this Village. Once Muqarab khan was the head of the tribe and village Dandoka in the past. The Leading Head Elders of the village and Tribe changes time to time but it is confirmed that it was always from Jaokhel tribes. The grandfather of Haji Mohammad Khurshid Khan, Mr. HASHIM KHAN was the one of the leading and high-profile personality of Khudai Khidmatgar Tahreek. Nowadays a prominent Khudai Khidmatgar worker (the son of Khwaja Mohammad Khan and the grandson of Hashim khan) Haji Mohammad Khurshid Khan is the Leading Head Elder of the Jaokhel tribe and Dandoka as well.

Jaokhels of Dandoqa migrated to this village from "Fateh jang" of District Attock in late 18th century. Though these peoples are not Punjabis but they were settled in Fateh Jang for their trade promotion. Muqarrab Khan was the first to have migrated to village Dandoqa and was the first chief of his Jaokhels tribe. He was succeeded by Hashim Khan. It was the time when the second major tribe, the Kakakhels entered the village and settled. Hashim Khan was succeeded by Dilawar Khan. At the cutting edge of his life, he appointed Mr. Nasrullah Khan as the chief of Jaokhels tribe in Dandoqa.

Nasrullah Khan was succeeded by his son, Malak Abdul Wahab (not an ethnic Malik but by family leading role). He was an influential man in the politics of the area and was famous for his non violent character unlike his political rivals, the Kakakhels, who were known for their aggression in politics. He was a member of the union council of his area and a hard working person. In broader sense, he was the actual asset of not only his tribe but for his village also. His sudden death in 2002 created a power vacuum for the position of chief in his tribe, but thanks to the good behaviour and skills of his cousin, Haji Khurshid Khan who successfully overcome these difficulties.

Upon the death of Malak Abdul Wahab, his cousin, Haji Muhammad Khurshid Khan was appointed as the chief of his tribe and he is still serving as head of his tribe with no controversies. He is a retired Tehsildar and active social worker and Khudai Kidmatgar. After his retirement as a Government servant, he soon became the Swabi District level Senior Vice President of Pakistan's largest nationalistic party, the Awami National Party, and he has been serving for his village as well as for his district from the last 40 years. His non violent character is the main weapon of his success. Unlike other members of his tribe, who have not focused on literacy of their children, Haji Muhammad Khurshid Khan is known for his special focus upon his children's education. His sons and grandsons are now serving in respectable departments like Health, Judiciary, Business, Education, Engineering and Humanitarian Work.

The Jaokhels of Yousafzai Malaks Hashimzai at Dandoqa, live a traditional life dominated by Pakhtoon Culture. Education has recently made growth in this tribe, with just a single family to have the greater number of graduates in different fields. The rest of Jaokhels lack any interest in education and that's why literacy ratio is limited to the home of the current chief of tribe only. However, they have made significant goals in field of agriculture, thereby making 90 percent of their income from promoted Agriculture.

Qureshi (Sayyeds)
Qureshi Tribe is also known as Sayyeds. According to their Elders they belong to one of the noble tribe Quraish. which in the most respectable and noble tribe of the Islamic History. Famous known personality are Haji Jameel Ahmad (baba g) and Sahb Ul Haq Shb.

Kaka Khel's
Migrated from Kaka Sahib, Nowshehra, to the village Dandoqa..
Kakakhels are the descendants of an individual, Syed Kasteer Gul who was a famous Muslim scholar. Syed Kasteer Gul belonged to Nowshehra of present-day Pakistan and was popular with the name "Kaka Sahib" in the local Pathan community. His descendants later on spread across Nowshehra, Swabi, Karak.

Others tribes
There are various others small tribes and families like Tharkan Carpenter, Lohar Blacksmith, Parachas, Mochi Shoemakers migrated to village dandoqa from various areas of Khyber Pakhtunkhwa in search of bread and butter and safe life for their families. All the tribes and families have great respect in the eyes of the leading families. 
All small tribes, families respect the elders of the village. and always ask the elders of big families for any problem they are facing in the village.

Education ratio
the education ratio is quite low in the area as majority of the peoples are poor and cannot afford the education expenses of their children. But still a tide of awareness in the peoples is seen especially in all tribes of the village. About 33% of the total village population is literate.

Agricultural status
In agricultural field, the major crops like Wheat, Tobacco, Maize, Sunflower, Rice, Sugar cane, Mustard, Potatoes, and all types of vegetables are cultivated here.

Culture
The common Peoples of Dandoqa, live a traditional life dominated by Pakhtoon Culture. Education has recently made growth in this village. The most of the common people of this village affiliated to Awami National Party, Pakistan Muslim League, Pakistan People Party, Pakistan Tehreek e Insaf, Jamiat Ulema e Islam. The educated class of these tribes are serving in respectable departments (Health, Judiciary, Business, Education, Engineering and Humanitarian Work).

Festivals
Religious festivals like Eid ul Fitar, Eid ul Azhaa and Eid e Melaad, Ramadan Mubarak are celebrated with religious zeal and passion. Other festivals and ceremonies like marriages, engagements, etc. are also celebrated with traditional pomp and show. Beating the drum (dholkey, in local dialect) has been one of the amazing trends followed up till now in marriage ceremonies.

Sports
In sports, Volley Ball and Cricket are the dominating games played in this village. Many young boys are today the players of volleyball for various teams like Pakistan Army, etc. Elders like to play cards in their local gathering houses called "Hujra".

Common life of inhabitants
The people of Dandoka live a traditional rural life. Religious festivals like Eid ul Fitar, Eid ul Azhaa and Eid e Melaad are celebrated with religious zeal and passion. Other festivals and ceremonies like marriages, engagements, etc. are also celebrated with traditional pomp and show. Beating the drum (dholkey, in local dialect) has been one of the amazing trends followed up till now in marriage ceremonies.

References

Swabi District